The  Washington Redskins season was the franchise's 36th season in the National Football League (NFL) and their 31st in Washington, D.C.  The team failed to improve on their 7–7 record from 1966 and finished 5–6–3.

The 1967 season marks the first season in the league's history where the league was divided into two conferences which were subdivided into two divisions. Up to 1967, the league was either divided into two divisions, two conferences, or neither.

Offseason

NFL Draft

Roster

Regular season

Schedule

Game summaries

Week 13

Week 14

Standings

References

Washington
Washington Redskins seasons
Washing